Daboase is a town in the western region of Ghana in West Africa and is the capital of Wassa East District, a district in the Western Region of Ghana.

References

Populated places in the Western Region (Ghana)